Royal Air Force Bempton or more simply RAF Bempton is a former Royal Air Force station situated at Bempton in the East Riding of Yorkshire, England,  north of Bridlington.  During the Second World War it was established as a radar station, becoming part of the Chain Home Low (CHL) network.

Operational history
 1940 The first CHL radar station was installed in early 1940 a few hundred feet from the lighthouse at Flamborough Head. A new higher site was found four miles up the coast on the  cliffs at Bempton.
The new site was opened in July 1940 as RAF Bempton. It was a CHL station. 
1941 became a CHL/Chain Home Extra Low (CHEL) radar station. 
It disbanded on 1 August 1945.
1945 – Air Ministry Experimental Station Type 31 
1 June 1949, re-established as a CHL/CHEL radar station.
17 February 1950 – transferred to RAF Fighter Command. 
On 1 November 1951 it was renamed as 146 Signals Unit Bempton rebuilt as a Centimetric Early Warning (CEW) radar station, part of the ROTOR Programme.
The 146 Signals Unit was disbanded on 1 December 1961
Bempton became a satellite station of RAF Patrington until its final closure in April 1972.

The site was also used for a secret High Speed Passive Array RADAR codenamed 'Winkle'. The distinctive Y-shaped concrete stanchions on the cliff edge are indicative of Winkle.

Current use
The site was sold in 1980/81. The stairs down to the bunker were removed and other entrances were sealed over with concrete.

In 2010, a teenager from Hull went missing after his car was found abandoned by Bempton Cliffs. Police conducted a search for a missing person around the cliff area and inside the former bunker as the teenager had been given a memory stick detailing the pornographic artwork that a cult had painted on the walls of the bunker.

Despite the Humberside Fire and Rescue Service later searching the area again for a body, no trace of Russell Bohling has been found.

References

External links

Subbrit – Photo tour of the bunker

Bempton
Military history of Yorkshire
Military history of the East Riding of Yorkshire